Santa Fé Airport  was a public use airport located  west-southwest of Santa Fé, Santa Fe, Argentina.

Google Earth Historical Imagery (4/18/2002) and current Google Maps show the former runway under varying degrees of water in a generally marshy area.

See also

Transport in Argentina
List of airports in Argentina

References 

Defunct airports
Airports in Argentina
Santa Fe Province